The National Arts Centre Orchestra (NAC Orchestra) is a Canadian orchestra based in Ottawa, Ontario led by music director Alexander Shelley. The NAC Orchestra's primary concert venue is Southam Hall at the National Arts Centre. Since its inception, the Orchestra has commissioned more than 90 works, mostly from Canadian composers. The NAC Orchestra has made over 50 commercially released recordings. The Orchestra has visited more than 125 cities in Canada and more than 130 cities internationally in its 51-year history, including a coast-to-coast Canadian tour in 1999 and again in 2017. In May 2019, the NAC Orchestra completed a major European tour, performing and delivering education events in five countries.

History
The NAC Orchestra was founded in 1969 as the resident orchestra of the newly opened National Arts Centre, with Jean-Marie Beaudet as music director and Mario Bernardi as founding conductor. Bernardi became music director in 1971 and held the post until 1982. The NAC Orchestra undertook first international tour in 1973 to Europe, travelling as far as Leningrad. The NAC Orchestra has remained committed to touring internationally, averaging approximately one tour per every two years. Previous tours have taken them to the UK, China, the United-States of America, and all over Europe.

Beaudet and Bernardi are the only Canadian conductors to be appointed music director of the NAC Orchestra. Bernardi was named Conductor Laureate in 1997. Subsequent NAC Orchestra music directors have included Franco Mannino (1982 to 1987), Gabriel Chmura (1987 to 1990), and Trevor Pinnock (1991-1997). From 1999 to 2015, Pinchas Zukerman was the NAC Orchestra's music director. The orchestra expanded to 61 players during Zukerman's tenure. In October 2013, the NAC Orchestra announced the appointment of Alexander Shelley as its next music director, as of the 2015–2016 season, with an initial contract of 4 years. In 2018, the NAC announced that his contract was renewed through to 2022.

Franz-Paul Decker was Principal Guest Conductor from 1991 to 1999. In 2001, Jean-Philippe Tremblay became the NAC Orchestra's Apprentice Conductor, a then newly created post, for a two-year term. John Storgards is the current Principal Guest conductor of the NAC Orchestra while Jack Everly is the Principal Pops Conductor.

Recordings

Music Directors
 Jean-Marie Beaudet (1969–1971)
 Mario Bernardi (1971–1982)
 Franco Mannino (1982–1987)
 Gabriel Chmura (1987–1990)
 Trevor Pinnock (1991–1997)
 Pinchas Zukerman (1999–2015)
 Alexander Shelley (2015–present)

See also
 List of symphony orchestras
 Canadian classical music

References

Musical groups established in 1969
Canadian orchestras
Musical groups from Ottawa
Tourist attractions in Ottawa
1969 establishments in Ontario